Bruce Tembo (born 2 March 1991) is a Zimbabwean cricketer. He made his first-class debut for Southern Rocks in the 2010–11 Logan Cup on 3 December 2010.

References

External links
 

1991 births
Living people
Zimbabwean cricketers
Southern Rocks cricketers
Sportspeople from Harare